Alkaline noodles, alkali noodles, or alkaline pasta is a variation of noodles with a much higher quantity of alkali than usual.  The most common examples are Japanese Ramen noodles and Chinese Lamian.  The addition of alkali changes both the flavor and texture of the noodles, and makes them feel slippery in the mouth and on the fingers; they also develop a yellow color and are more elastic than ordinary noodles.  Various flours such as ordinary all-purpose white flour, bread flour, and semolina flour can be used, with somewhat varying results. The yellow color is due to flavones that occur naturally in flour, which are normally colorless but turn yellow at alkaline pH.

Sources of alkali 

High alkalinity is typically achieved by the introduction of sodium carbonate (Na2CO3 or sodium salt of carbonic acid) into the primary ingredients.  In parts of China in which alkaline wheat noodles are common, they are traditionally made with alkaline water from wells.  More commonly a mixture of 20% sodium carbonate, which is also an anti-caking agent, and 80% potassium carbonate in water is added directly. This mixture is what the Chinese call jian or jian shui() and what the Japanese call kansui(). Sometimes kansui can also be a solution of sodium hydroxide or a powdered mix of sodium carbonate, potassium carbonate, and sometimes sodium phosphates in various proportions (solid kansui).

Chinese noodles from Gansu Province in China include the chewy "hand-pulled" type, Lamian, which are formed with no rolling or extrusion. Proper texture requires the addition of the alkaline peng hui , which is traditionally derived from the ash of the Halogeton arachnoideus plant.  Traditional Peng Hui potash contains potassium carbonate, which makes the noodle dough softer and more tender by inhibiting the development of gluten.  In 1989 the first artificial replacement was developed by the Lanzhou University (now the Gansu Lisi Food Science & Technology Co.) which is a mixture of salt, Sodium Carbonate, Sodium Tripolyphosphate, and Sodium Metabisulfite. "Lanzhou pulled noodles", even though the noodle makers may not be from Lanzhou, the capital of Gansu, are becoming, according to the New York Times, "a catchphrase that signifies deliciousness everywhere, [like] 'Chicago pizza' or 'New York bagels'."

In addition to peng hui, jian, and kansui, Harold McGee, a well-known American food scientist and author, has drawn on the experience of such noted chefs as David Chang, owner of the Momofuku line of restaurants, and Fuchsia Dunlop of London, to outline a simple method by which home chefs can make alkaline noodles by baking ordinary baking soda at 300 °F (150 °C) for an hour.  By baking the sodium bicarbonate, water vapor and carbon dioxide gas are released, and what is left is the alkaline sodium carbonate. Only a very small of amount of the resultant sodium carbonate is used in the preparation of McGee's pasta dish, just 1 teaspoon of it to 1-1/2 cups of semolina flour.  When preparing the pasta, the sodium carbonate is first dissolved in a small quantity of water, which is then slowly added to the semolina.  Afterwards, the kneaded dough is allowed to rest for an hour and is then rolled out very thin through a pasta machine and processed into the desired form of noodles.

References 

Pasta
Noodles
Chinese inventions
Chinese noodles
Japanese noodles
Japanese Chinese cuisine